Thoburnia hamiltoni (rustyside sucker) is a species of ray-finned fish in the family Catostomidae.
It is found only in the United States.

Sources 
|

Catostomidae
Taxonomy articles created by Polbot
Fish described in 1946